Don Mancuso (born March 26, 1955 in Rochester, New York) is an American rock music guitarist and songwriter best known for his role as guitarist and co-writer for the rock band Black Sheep as well as The Lou Gramm Band and The Voice of Foreigner.  He also has a successful solo career and continues to work with Phil Naro in DDrive. He is also working with Regi Hendrix on his first solo effort.

Biography
Mancuso attended Greece Olympia High School in Rochester, New York, and graduated in 1973. He attended the College Of Marin for music and graduated from Monroe Community College with an AAS degree in Electronics Engineering in 1988.

Pre-solo work
Mancuso began his music career playing guitar in Black Sheep. After the release of the band's self-titled Black Sheep and Encouraging Words, he continued to write and record with groups such as Cheater, Lou Gramm Band, Johnny Smoke, The Park Ave Band, Phil Naro and Celtic Fire.

The Lou Gramm Band
In 2004, Mancuso was asked to join his former Black Sheep bandmate (and former Foreigner frontman) Lou Gramm in his new Lou Gramm Band, which also included another Black Sheep alumnus, Bruce Turgon.  The band plays old Foreigner hits as well as Lou Gramm Band material, and released a Christian rock release, for which Mancuso wrote half the music.

Discography
 The Lou Gramm Band: The Lou Gramm Band (2009)  
 DDRIVE
 Straight Up The Middle (2007)
 3D (2010) Melodic Revolution Records

Solo albums
 Now You See It (1999) 
 DDRIVE (2004) 
 No Strings Attached  EP, Melodic Revolution Records (2011)  
 It's Christmas, featuring Lou Gramm,  Single  Melodic Revolution Records (2013)

Other albums/DVDs
 Black Sheep, Black Sheep, Capitol Records (1975)
 Encouraging Words, Black Sheep, Capitol Records (1976)
 Ten Cent Love Affair, Indie, Cheater (1985)
 Ready or Not, Lou Gramm, Atlantic Records (1987)
 Bridge, Red Heart, Indie (1997)
 Into Your Life, Tom Passamonti, Indie (1998)
 Crime Don't Pay Yet, Indie, Johnny Smoke (1999)
 Flames Of Eviction, Celtic Fire, Indie (2001)
 Jessi Hamilton, Jessi Hamilton, Indie (2002)
 Jessi Hamilton,  Indie (2005)
 Don Mancuso's DDRIVE,  GFI Records (2004)
 DDRIVE Straight Up The Middle Melodic Revolution Records (2006)
 The Lou Gramm Band, Spectra Records/North America-Frontiers Records/Europe & Asia (2009)
 DDRIVE 3D, including full color 3D art, poster and glasses,  Melodic Revolution Records (2010)
 No Strings Attached EP,  Melodic Revolution Records (2011)
 It's Christmas Single,  Melodic Revolution Records (2012)
 DDrive Critical Mass,  Melodic Revolution Records (2013)
 Lisa Gee & the 422  Love & Hate, Indie (2013)
 DDrive Intermission EP,  Melodic Revolution Records(2014)
 PFP Paul Fisher Project Beginners Luck, Indie (2014)
 Don Mancuso & DDrive Live at the Rochester International Jazz Festival DVD,  Indie (2014)
 Don Mancuso & DDrive To Live & To Love CD,  Indie (2017)
 Lisa Gee Various releases with Kenny Aronoff & James LoMenzo CD,  Indie (2018)
 Lips Turn Blue CD,  MIG Music Germany (2022)
 Lisa Gee EP Love Thing with Carmine Appice & James LoMenzo CD,  Deko Ent (2023)

External links
 Don's official website

References

Living people
American people of Italian descent
Musicians from Rochester, New York
Black Sheep (rock band) members
1955 births
American rock guitarists
College of Marin alumni
American male guitarists
20th-century American guitarists
20th-century American male musicians